Lucky is a 2012 Indian Telugu-language romantic comedy film written and directed by Hari. The film stars Srikanth and Meghana Raj in the lead roles.It is remake of marathi movie aga bai arecha(2004). Srinivas Reddy produced this movie under the Raja Rajeswari Pictures Banner and Sai Karthik provided the music. The movie was released on 1 November 2012.

Cast
 Srikanth as Lakshmi Narayana "Lucky"
 Meghana Raj as Janaki
 Jayasudha
 Roja as Lucky's boss
 Brahmanandam
 Ali
 Raghu Babu
 Dharmavarapu Subramanyam as Lawyer Kishan Kumar
 A. V. S. as Lucky's father
 Sana as Lucky's mother
 Thagubothu Ramesh as Lucky's friend
 Dhanraj as Lucky's friend
 Saikumar Pampana
 Nalla Venu as Lucky's friend
 Geetha Singh as Taxi driver
 Sudeepa Pinky

Soundtrack

The audio was released at Prasad Labs in Hyderabad on 2 October 2012. Padmasri Dr. Brahmanandam released the audio CDs and presented them to Dr. D. Ramanaidu and Srikanth. Other prominent guests were SV Krishna Reddy, Srinu Vaitla, AVS, Roja, Sagar, T. Prasanna Kumar, KVV Satyanarayana, etc.

References

2012 films
2010s Telugu-language films
Indian romantic comedy films
Films scored by Sai Karthik
2012 romantic comedy films